Diego Rosa may refer to:

 Diego Rosa (cyclist) (born 1989), Italian professional cyclist
 Diego Rosa (footballer, born 1989), Brazilian professional footballer
 Diego Rosa, Venetian architect, husband of Bice Lazzari
 Diego Rosa (footballer, born 1998), Uruguayan professional footballer
 Diego Rosa (footballer, born 2002), Brazilian professional footballer